Piotr Protasiewicz  (born 25 January 1975 in Zielona Góra, Poland) is a Polish international speedway rider. He is a four times World team champion.

Career

Protasiewicz began his career riding for Falubaz Zielona Góra in 1991 where he would spend four seasons. He began to record some notable performances including reaching the finals of three Speedway Under-21 World Championship in 1993, 1995 and 1996. In the 1996 final he scored a perfect 15 point maximum to be crowned the World U21 champion.

He rode for the Polish national team in the 1996 Speedway World Cup and in October 1997, during the Speedway Grand Prix Qualification he won the GP Challenge, which ensured that he claimed a permanent slot for the 1998 Grand Prix. He would repeat this feat three years later in October 2003.

Protasiewicz made his British league debut in 1998 for the King's Lynn Stars and would spend two seasons with the Peterborough Panthers and two seasons with the Ipswich Witches before a final season with Oxford Cheetahs in 2007. He won a second World Cup gold medal for Poland in the 2005.

In total he rode in 12 Speedway Grand Prix series, the laste bing the 2010 Speedway Grand Prix. Protasiewicz won his third and fourth Speedway World Cup gold medals at the 2009 Speedway World Cup, 2011 Speedway World Cup.

He spent several seasons with Polonia Bydgoszcz before returning to his first club Zielona Góra. In 2022, he started his 16th consecutive season with the club.

Awards
For his sport achievements, he received the Silver Cross of Merit in 2000.

Personal life
He married his girlfriend Katarzyna on 25 October 2002. They have two children. His father, Paweł was speedway rider too.

Speedway Grand Prix results

Honours

Speedway Grand Prix
1996 - 21st place (as wild card)
1997 - 13th place
1998 - 21st place
1999 - 30th place (as wild card)
2000 - 30th place (as wild card)
2001 - 20th place
2002 - 24th place (as wild card)
2003 - 11th place
2004 - 15th place
2005 - 18th place (as wild card)
2006 - 16th place
2010 - 18th place

World Under-21 Championship
 1993 - 5th place
 1995 - 7th place
 1996 - World Champion

Speedway World Cup
1996 World Champion
2001 - Silver medal
2002 - 4th place
2003 - 4th place
2005 - World Champion
2006 - 5th place
2009 - World Champion
2011 - World Champion
2006 - 5th place
2014 - Silver medal

Individual Speedway Polish Championship
1995 - 10th in Semi-Final
1996 - 13th in Semi-Final
1997 - 6th place
1998 - 7th place
1999 - Polish Champion
2000 - 14th place
2001 - 13th place
2002 - 5th place
2003 - 11th place
2004 - 10th place
2005 - 4th place
2006 - 7th place

Other events
Individual Speedway Junior Polish Championship (U-21)

1995 - Silver medal

Polish Pairs Speedway Championship

1993 - Silver medal
1995 - Silver medal
1997 - Polish Champion
1998 - Silver medal
1999 - Polish Champion
2000 - Polish Champion
2001 - Silver medal
2002 - Polish Champion
2003 - Bronze medal
2004 - Polish Champion
2005 - Silver medal
2006 - Silver medal

Polish Pairs Speedway Junior Championship (U-21)

1993 - Bronze medal

Team Speedway Polish Championship
1995 - Polish Champion
1997 - Polish Champion
1998 - Polish Champion
1999 - 4th place
2000 - Polish Champion
2001 - Bronze medal
2002 - Polish Champion
2003 - Silver medal
2004 - 4th place
2005 - Silver medal
2006 - Bronze medal

See also
Polish national speedway team
List of Speedway Grand Prix riders

References

Polish speedway riders
1975 births
Living people
Speedway World Cup champions
Polish speedway champions
Polonia Bydgoszcz riders
People from Zielona Góra
Sportspeople from Lubusz Voivodeship
Ipswich Witches riders
King's Lynn Stars riders
Oxford Cheetahs riders
Peterborough Panthers riders